

France
 Malta – Claude-Henri Belgrand de Vaubois, Military Governor of Malta (1798–1800)

Ottoman Empire
 Principality of Abkhazia – Kelesh Begi (1789–1806)

Portugal
 Angola – Miguel António de Melo, Governor of Angola (1797–1802)
 Macau –
 D. Cristovao Pereira de Castro, Governor of Macau (1797–1800)
 Jose Manuel Pinto, Governor of Macau (1800–1803)

Spanish Empire
Viceroyalty of New Granada – Pedro Mendinueta y Múzquiz, Viceroy of New Granada (1797–1803)
Viceroyalty of New Spain –
Miguel José de Azanza (1798–1800)
Félix Berenguer de Marquina (1800–1803)
Captaincy General of Cuba – Salvador de Muro y Salazar, Governor of Cuba (1799–1812)
Spanish East Indies – Rafael María de Aguilar y Ponce de León, Governor-General of the Philippines (1793–1806)
Commandancy General of the Provincias Internas – Pedro da Nava, Commandant General of the Interior Provinces (1793–1802)
Viceroyalty of Peru – Ambrosio O'Higgins (1796–1801)
Captaincy General of Chile – Joaquín del Pino y Rozas, Royal Governor of Chile (1799–1801)
Viceroyalty of the Río de la Plata – Gabriel de Avilés, Viceroy of the Río de la Plata (1799–1801)

United Kingdom
 Bermuda – George Beckwith, Governor of Bermuda (1798–1803)
 Cayman Islands – William Bodden, Chief Magistrate of the Cayman Islands (1776–1823)
 Ceylon – Frederick North, Governor of Ceylon (1798–1805)
 Jamaica – Alexander Lindsay, 6th Earl of Balcarres, Governor of Jamaica (1795–1801)
 Madras – Edward Clive, Governor of Madras (1798–1803)
 Malta Protectorate – Alexander Ball, Civil Commissioner of Malta (1799–1801)
 New South Wales – 
John Hunter, Governor of New South Wales (1795 – 28 September 1800)
Philip Gidley King, Governor of New South Wales (1800–1806)
Newfoundland – Sir Charles Pole, Commodore-Governor of Newfoundland (1800–1801)

Colonial governors
Colonial governors
1800